Bonney Forge was founded in Philadelphia, Pennsylvania in 1876  by Charles S. Bonney.  Originally Bonney Forge crafted forged and finished hardware for horse-drawn wagons, later it became a manufacturer of automotive hand tools, and now it is a manufacturer of fittings and unions, branch connections, steel valves and specialty products.

In 1953 Bonney Forge was taken over by the Miller Manufacturing Company of Detroit, Michigan. In 1964 the firm was sold to Kelsey-Hayes Corp. of Romulus, Michigan.

The company was for many years based in Allentown, Pennsylvania, where it had some of its manufacturing operations. Bonney Forge also had manufacturing operations in Alliance, Ohio, Orangeburg, South Carolina and near Milan, Italy.

Plant closures
In March 1964 Bonney Forge closed its manufacturing plant in Allentown, after it moved manufacturing operations from there to the Mount Union, Pennsylvania. In August 2001 Bonney Forge closed its manufacturing plant in Allentown because the plant building could not be modernized to handle a new press.

Distribution
Bonney Forge valves are broadly distributed internationally, prominently through HSP Valves in the UK, The Alloy Valve Stockist in Spain, and AIV in the US.

See also
 List of defunct consumer brands

References

External links

Bonney's 1967 Tool Catalog on the Internet Archive

Defunct consumer brands
Tool manufacturing companies of the United States
Automotive tool manufacturers
Manufacturing companies based in Pennsylvania
Manufacturing companies established in 1876
1876 establishments in Pennsylvania